Chili's Grill & Bar is an American casual dining restaurant chain. The company was founded by Larry Lavine in Texas in 1975 and is currently owned and operated by Brinker International.

History
Chili's first location, a converted postal station on Greenville Avenue in the Vickery Meadows area of Dallas, Texas, opened in 1975. The original Chili's on Greenville Avenue moved to a new building on the same site in 1981 before relocating again in 2007.

Lavine's concept was to create an informal, full-service dining restaurant with a menu featuring different types of hamburgers offered at an affordable price. The brand proved successful, and by the early 1980s, there were 28 Chili's locations in the region, all featuring similar Southwest decor.

In 1983, Lavine sold the company to restaurant executive Norman E. Brinker, formerly of the Pillsbury restaurant group that owned Bennigan's.

Menu 
Chili's serves American food, Tex-Mex cuisine and dishes influenced by Mexican cuisine, such as spicy shrimp tacos, quesadillas, fajitas.

In addition to their regular menu, the company offers a nutritional menu, allergen menu, and vegetarian menu. In 2016, the "Sunrise Burger" (which includes an egg) and the "Ultimate Bacon Burger" were added to the menu.

In 1990, a breakfast menu consisting of pancakes, waffles, French toast, toast, cereal, eggs and bacon, scrambled eggs, and omelets was added to Chili's.

On September 8, 2018, the breakfast menu was removed for unspecified reasons.

Advertising
"Chili's (Welcome to Chili's!)" is an advertising jingle used in Chili's Restaurant commercials to advertise the restaurant's line of baby back ribs. The song was written by Guy Bommarito and produced by Tom Faulkner Productions for GSD&M Advertising of Austin, Texas. Faulkner sings both "I want my baby back, baby back, baby back...", as well as the melodic theme. The deep "Bar-B-Q sauce" line was sung by famed New York bass vocalist Willie McCoy. A 1996 rendition of the jingle features a doo-wop quartet, Take 6, singing a cappella. Advertising Age magazine named the song first on its list of "10 songs most likely to get stuck in your head" in 2004. In October 2017, the jingle was revived to advertise Chili's new menu, where it was re-conceptualized as "Oh Baby, Chili's is Back (Baby, Back, Baby, Back)".

In 2008, the chain aired parody ads for "P. J. Bland's", a fictional restaurant chain with cardboard foods.

In 2012, Chili's used Wendy Rene's Stax single, "Bar-B-Q", in their TV commercial.

In September 2017, Chili's dropped about 40 percent of its menu items to focus on burgers, ribs, and fajitas.

In February 2020, Chili's announced a new marketing campaign encouraging people to "laugh so hard you pee a little." The new campaign was focused on "Out to 'Ita" and used elements of ASMR.

Locations

As of 2015, they have 1,580 locations worldwide, including 839 that are company-owned and 741 that are franchised.

Legal problems
In October 2008, a Chili's Australia franchise was prosecuted and fined A$300,000 by the NSW Office of Industrial Relations for underpaying staff, pressuring employees to sign an Australian workplace agreement, and failing to pay A$45,000 in owed wages by a deadline set by the Office of Industrial Relations. In the same year, Chili's announced that it would be permanently closing all of its Australian locations indefinitely due to poor sales, unprofitability, and due to the company failing to comply with the Fair Work Act 2009.

Controversies 

 2008: On June 5, a woman from Washington named Anne Paskett filed a class-action suit against Brinker International. Paskett and the rest of the plaintiffs claimed that the restaurant chain's so-called healthier offerings, like the Chili's  "Guiltless Black Bean Burger"  have nutritional values much different than the ones listed on the menu. Independent laboratory tests were conducted, discovering that the fat content of the items are sometimes 'double, or even triple, the amount shown on these menus.
 2009: Brinker International fired a Chili's employee for the claim of sexual harassment, only to employ her again after the public outrage. They claimed that her termination was a computer error.
 2018: Brinker International disclosed that its data network had been breached between March and April 2018, exposing the personally identifiable information of its customers. Subsequently, several customers of Chili's filed suit against the company, alleging that its failure to comply with industry standards for information security and implement adequate data security measures to protect its data networks from the potential danger of a data breach had caused them to incur fraudulent charges on their payment cards.
 2019: Chili's Restaurant was fined after an employee fell into a vat of scalding water.
 2020: Brinker International and its Chili's subsidiary paid US$150,000 to settle sexual harassment allegations from five female employees.

In popular culture 
Chili's was a key location in The Office season 2 episode "The Client". The episode shows Michael and Jan meeting a client at a local Chili's restaurant after Michael had changed the location of the meeting from Radisson citing Chili's as "the new golf course". The Chili's jingle was also used in Austin Powers: The Spy Who Shagged Me where Fat Bastard meets Dr. Evil with the mojo belonging to Austin Powers. When he sees Mini-Me walk out with the money, startling him, he tries to eat him, thinking he is a baby. After attempting to eat Mini-Me, Fat Bastard suggests that Dr. Evil keeps the mojo, and he gets the baby, and then sings the Chili's Babyback Ribs song. In Season one of "That 90's Show", the recurring character, Fez, mentions Chili's is the location where he and his current lover had met, also making a reference to the Babyback Ribs jingle.

References

External links

 

Companies based in Dallas
Restaurants established in 1975
Restaurant chains in the United States
Restaurant franchises
Tex-Mex restaurants
American companies established in 1975
1975 establishments in Texas
Multinational restaurant chains